William Francis Gambetta (6 April 1897 – 26 July 1957) was an  Australian rules footballer who played with South Melbourne in the Victorian Football League (VFL).

Notes

External links 

Billy Gambetta's playing statistics from The VFA Project

1897 births
1957 deaths
Australian rules footballers from Victoria (Australia)
Sydney Swans players
Hawthorn Football Club (VFA) players
Yarraville Football Club players